Events from the year 1887 in Canada.

Incumbents

Crown 
 Monarch – Victoria

Federal government 
 Governor General – Henry Petty-Fitzmaurice 
 Prime Minister – John A. Macdonald
 Chief Justice – William Johnstone Ritchie (New Brunswick)
 Parliament – 5th (until 15 January) then 6th (from 13 April)

Provincial governments

Lieutenant governors 
Lieutenant Governor of British Columbia – Clement Francis Cornwall (until February 8) then Hugh Nelson  
Lieutenant Governor of Manitoba – James Cox Aikins 
Lieutenant Governor of New Brunswick – Samuel Leonard Tilley  
Lieutenant Governor of Nova Scotia – Matthew Henry Richey    
Lieutenant Governor of Ontario – John Beverley Robinson (until June 1) then Alexander Campbell  
Lieutenant Governor of Prince Edward Island – Andrew Archibald Macdonald
Lieutenant Governor of Quebec – Louis-Rodrigue Masson (until October 4) then Auguste-Réal Angers

Premiers 
Premier of British Columbia – William Smithe (until March 28) then Alexander Edmund Batson Davie (from April 1)
Premier of Manitoba – John Norquay (until December 26) then David Howard Harrison 
Premier of New Brunswick – Andrew George Blair  
Premier of Nova Scotia – William Stevens Fielding
Premier of Ontario – Oliver Mowat    
Premier of Prince Edward Island – William Wilfred Sullivan 
Premier of Quebec – John Jones Ross (until January 25) then Louis-Olivier Taillon (January 25 to January 27) then Honoré Mercier

Territorial governments

Lieutenant governors 
 Lieutenant Governor of Keewatin – James Cox Aikins
 Lieutenant Governor of the North-West Territories – Edgar Dewdney

Events
January 25 – Sir Louis-Olivier Taillon becomes premier of Quebec, replacing John Jones Ross.
January 27 – Honoré Mercier becomes premier of Quebec, replacing Sir Louis-Olivier Taillon.
February 22 – Federal election:  Sir John A. Macdonald's Conservatives win a third consecutive majority.
March 3 – The United States imposes the Fisheries Retaliation Act putting limits on Canadian fishermen and traders
March 28 – William Smithe, Premier of British Columbia, dies in office.
April 1 – Alexander Davie becomes premier of British Columbia.
April 23 – McMaster University founded
May 3 – 148 coal miners are killed in a mine explosion near Nanaimo, British Columbia
June 7 – Wilfrid Laurier becomes leader of the Liberal Party of Canada
June 20 – Golden Jubilee of Victoria's accession as Queen
December 3 – Saturday Night founded
December 26 – David H. Harrison becomes premier of Manitoba, replacing John Norquay.
The first premiers' conference is held at Quebec City, Quebec

Births

January to June
January 21  – Georges Vézina, ice hockey player (d.1926)
February 20 – Vincent Massey, lawyer, diplomat and Governor General of Canada (d.1967)
February 25 – Andrew McNaughton, army officer, politician and diplomat (d.1966)
April 13 – Gordon S. Fahrni, medical doctor (d.1995)
May 21 – James Gladstone, first Status Indian to be appointed to the Senate of Canada (d.1971)

July to December
July 4 – Tom Longboat, long-distance runner (d.1949)
July 5 – Joseph Charles-Émile Trudeau, entrepreneur and father of Pierre Trudeau, who would later become Prime Minister of Canada (d.1935) 
September 17 – Georges Poulin, hockey player (d. 1971)
October 8 – Huntley Gordon, actor (d.1956)
October 14 – Frances Loring, sculptor (d.1968)
December 20 – Walter Russell Shaw, politician and Premier of Prince Edward Island (d.1981)

Deaths
February 25 – Augustin-Magloire Blanchet, missionary (b.1797)
March 28 – William Smithe, politician and 6th Premier of British Columbia (b.1842)
May 4 – William Murdoch, poet (b.1823)
May 8 – Sir William Young, Premier of Nova Scotia (b.1799)
June 25 – Matthew Crooks Cameron, lawyer, judge and politician (b.1822)
August 18 – John Palliser, explorer and geographer (b.1817)
October 11 – Louis-Adélard Senécal, businessman and politician (b.1829)
October 12 – William Annand, 2nd Premier of Nova Scotia (b.1808)

Historical documents
Senate committee suggests seeding North-West with wild rice, developing bison hybrid, and preserving food using Indigenous ways

Senate debate on North-West Territories growth blames decades of delay on British ignorance (Note: "Indians" and "civilize" stereotypes)

Canadian Pacific Railway offers land seekers $25 return fare to Winnipeg, with option to go on westward (and fare refunded if 160 acres purchased)

Statistical snapshot of Ontario, with note on reciprocity with U.S.

Royal commission hears that labour and small business in Toronto are squeezed by increasing competition and rising rents

"A blot on our Statute Book" - Sen. William Johnston Almon against Chinese head tax law penalizing any immigrant with "yellow skin and an almond eye"

Opposition Leader Wilfrid Laurier comments on "cancer of emigration" to United States

References
  

 
Years of the 19th century in Canada
Canada
1887 in North America